Charles G. Reavis (born May 31, 1892) was an American politician who served in the North Carolina Senate. A Republican, he represented the 24th District. Reavis was born in Yadkin County, North Carolina. He also served as sheriff of Yadkin County.

He lived in Yadkinville.

References

External links

1892 births
Year of death missing
Place of death missing
Republican Party North Carolina state senators
People from Yadkinville, North Carolina
North Carolina sheriffs
20th-century American politicians